Kampong Cham municipality is a municipality (krong)  of Kampong Cham province, Cambodia. Kampong Cham is considered an urban district. The provincial capital Kampong Cham City is located in this district. The city is located on National Highway 7 124 kilometres by road from the capital Phnom Penh. The district is split by the Mekong and the capital is located on the western bank of the river., since 2001, the Kizuna bridge provides a good junction for the region.

Location 
Kampong Cham district is the smallest district in Kampong Cham Province and is surrounded by other Kampong Cham districts. Reading from the north clockwise, Kampong Cham shares a border with Kampong Siem District while Tbong Khmom District forms the eastern boundary. To the south of Kampong Cham is Koh Soutin District. Kampong Siem lies on the western border.

Administration 
The Kampong Cham district governor reports to Hun Neng, the Governor of Kampong Cham. The following table shows the villages of Kampong Cham district by commune.

Demographics 

The district is subdivided into 4 communes (khum) and 24 villages (phum). According to the 1998 Census, the population of the district was 45,354 persons in 8,236 households in 1998. With a population of over 45,000 people, Kampong Cham is the least populated district in Kampong Cham province and is the smallest in area. The average household size in Kampong Cham is 5.4 persons per household, slightly lower than the average for urban areas of Cambodia (5.5). However, this is the largest household size of any district in Kampong Cham province and reflects the district's status as an urban centre. The sex ratio in the district is 94.9%, with more females than males.

References

External links
update 11-09-2019 by yim marin
Kampong Cham at Royal Government of Cambodia website
Kampong Cham at Ministry of Commerce website

Districts of Kampong Cham province